The Hengchun Line is a planned branch line of the Taiwan Railways Administration (TRA) South-link line which plans to connect Taiwan's southern capital Kaohsiung to Kenting, a popular tourist destination located in Hengchun. Express train service that connects Xinzuoying Station, the major hub for both Taiwan High Speed Rail and Taiwan Railways Administration trains, to Hengchun is also planned. Construction will start in 2017.

History
In 1876, the Governor of Fujian Province Ding Ri-chang (zh) proposed a railway line running from Keelung to Hengchun, and under a 1924 plan proposed during Japanese rule, the Hengchun Line was planned to branch off from the Pingtung line, however that plan was shelved in 1927 due to budgetary constraints.

The need to construct the Hengchun Line became apparent with the opening of Kenting National Park in 1984 as well as the fact that Hengchun Airport (opened in 2004) is often affected by strong winds. Also, the washing away of several bridges of Provincial Highway 1 during Typhoon Haitang in 2005 further highlighted the importance of the need for the Hengchun Line. In 2002 a feasibility study was completed, however in 2005 the Ministry of Transportation and Communications (MOTC) recommended that coach transportation be used entirely from Fangliao railway station to Kenting National Park. After further lobbying from Hengchun residents, the MOTC conducted a revised feasibility study in 2014, this time including express service using TRA rolling stock from Xinzuoying Station to Hengchun Station. The latter study was approved by the Executive Yuan in December 2015, and after all land acquisition is completed, construction is expected to begin in 2017 with completion in 2024–2025. A branch line leading to the National Museum of Marine Biology and Aquarium is currently under discussion.

Stations

References

3 ft 6 in gauge railways in Taiwan
TRA routes
Proposed railway lines